In enzymology, a (deoxy)adenylate kinase is an enzyme that catalyzes the chemical reaction

ATP + dAMP  ADP + dADP

Thus, the two substrates of this enzyme are ATP and dAMP, whereas its two products are ADP and dADP.

This enzyme belongs to the family of transferases, specifically those transferring phosphorus-containing groups (phosphotransferases) with a phosphate group as acceptor.  The systematic name of this enzyme class is ATP:(d)AMP phosphotransferase. This enzyme participates in purine metabolism.

References

 

EC 2.7.4
Enzymes of unknown structure